St John's High School is a school in Siddipet, Medak, Telangana, India.  It is one of the oldest schools in the city.

Background
St. John's High School, Siddipet, was established on 1 June 1968 by late Rev. Y. John Christudas and the present Headmaster Smt. S. Tara Aseervadam. It prepares the boys and girls for the SSC Examination through the medium of English.

See also
Education in India
List of schools in India
List of institutions of higher education in Telangana

References

External links
St. John's High School, Siddipet

High schools and secondary schools in Telangana
Medak district
Educational institutions established in 1968
1968 establishments in Andhra Pradesh
Siddipet